Bandh means "a bond" in Sanskrit and "closed" in Urdu. It is a form of political protest in South Asian countries. Bandh may also refer to
Films
Bandh Darwaza, a 1990 Bollywood horror movie
Bharat Bandh, a 1991 Telugu political thriller film 
Hafta Bandh, a 1991 Indian film 
Darwaaza Bandh Rakho, a 2006 Indian Bollywood comedy film 
Bandh Nylon Che, a 2016 Marathi-language family drama film

Other
Badgaon Bandh, a village in Rajasthan, India
Ummed Sagar Bandh, a dam near Jodhpur in Rajasthan, India